For Bitter or Worse is the sixth studio album from the Dutch singer Anouk. The album was released on 18 September 2009, via the record label EMI.

The first single from the album, "Three Days in a Row" was released in August. It reached the top of the Netherlands charts in September 2009, making it Anouk's first number one in the country. In June of the same year, one of the songs recorded for the album, "Today", was released as promo material. It was so successful that, despite never being released as an official single, the song reached number 50 in the Dutch chart.
The second single Woman, was sent to radio stations at the end of October 2009. After just one day the single was at number one on airplay chart. The single was released physically on 24 November 2009.

Track listing
"Three Days in a Row"
"In This World" 
"Woman" 
"Lay It Down" 
"8 Years" 
"My Shoes" 
"Walk to the Bay" 
"Today" 
"Hold On" 
"Lovedrunk" 
"Faith in My Moon" 
"For Bitter or Worse"

Charting and sales
For Bitter or Worse debuted at number one on the Dutch Hot 100 after only two days of release and was certified platinum with sales of over 60,000 copies.

On November 17, 2009, it was announced that For Bitter or Worse had reached double Platinum status in the Netherlands with sales of over 120,000.

Tour
Before the release of the album, Anouk announced that she would tour in November and December to promote the album. Thus far only dates in the Netherlands and Belgium have been announced.

Charts

Weekly charts

Year-end charts

References

2009 albums
Anouk (singer) albums